Pigs Pigs Pigs Pigs Pigs Pigs Pigs, also styled as Pigs x7, are a British stoner metal and hard rock band formed in Newcastle upon Tyne in 2012. Their debut album, Feed the Rats, was released on UK label Rocket Recordings in 2017. The Guardian listed the band as one of their "top 40 newcomers" for 2018, and in 2018 their second album King of Cowards was released, described by The Quietus as an "epic and sprawling record".

In April 2020, the band released their third album, Viscerals. In May 2020, The Guardian listed the album as one of the twenty best albums released so far that year in their mid-year list. An LP of live tracks, Off Cuts, was released in November 2020 exclusively through Rough Trade's record shops.

Musical style 
The band's music has been associated with psych rock and heavy metal, as well as related genres doom metal and noise rock. Earlier releases tended toward longer, drawn out tracks while the more recent releases are predominantly shorter works.

Members 
Current
 Matthew Baty – lead vocals (2012–present)
 Sam Grant – guitar (2012–present)
 Adam Ian Sykes – lead guitar (2012–present)
 John-Michael Joseph Hedley – bass (2012–present)
 Ewan Mackenzie – drums (2012–2017, 2022–present)

Former
 Chris Morley – drums (2017–2021)

Discography 
Albums
 Feed the Rats (Rocket Recordings, 2017)
 King of Cowards (Rocket Recordings, 2018)
 Viscerals (Rocket Recordings, 2020)
 Land of Sleeper (2023)

Physical singles and EPs
 "The Cosmic Dead" / "Pigs Pigs Pigs Pigs Pigs Pigs Pigs" (split 12" single, The Old Noise, 2012)
 Psychopomp (mini-album, Box Records, 2014)
 "Cake of Light" (Rocket Recordings, 2018)
 "GNT" (Rocket Recordings, 2018)
 "Reducer" (Rocket Recordings, 2020)
 "Rubbernecker" (Rocket Recordings, 2020)
 "Hell's Teeth" (Rocket Recordings, 2020)
 "Hot Stuff" (Rocket Recordings, 2021)

References 

English heavy metal musical groups
2012 establishments in the United Kingdom
Musical groups from Newcastle upon Tyne
English doom metal musical groups
English stoner rock musical groups